Acanthomeridion is an extinct arthropod found in the Chengjiang fauna deposits of China. In 1997, it was placed in its own, monotypic family, Acanthomeridiidae. It is known from eight specimens, all found in China.

Morphology 
Acanthomeridion was a 35 mm-long animal, with 11 segments ending in rear-facing spines. The head features free cheeks separated from the rest of the head by sutures. This is analogous with trilobites. Otherwise, affinities are mainly unclear. More recently discovered specimens of the species Acanthomeridion anacanthus have paired gut diverticula as have been seen in artiopods. No fossils exposing the limbs have yet been found, but they are thought to be biramous with the upper section of the limb holding the gills. As limbs have not been found, it is uncertain whether Acanthomeridion was a seafloor-dweller or a swimmer. The streamlining suggests that it swam, but is inconclusive.

Taxonomy 
Acanthomeridion is considered a primitive member of Artiopoda. Some studies have put it as having affinities with petalopleurans or xandarellids, but a more recent study by Hou, Williams et al. including the more recently discovered specimens suggest that it is the most basal member of the clade.

References

Maotianshan shales fossils
Prehistoric arthropod genera
Monotypic arthropod genera
Arthropod enigmatic taxa